Michel Fattal (born in 1954 in Alexandria, Egypt) is a French-language author whose works are translated into Italian and Polish.

Michel Fattal treats statute of Logos (language, reason) in Greek Philosophy. The works of Heraclitus and Aristotle, of Parmenides, Plato, Chrysippus and Plotinus are also sources of inspiration to him.

He is the author of several books on Plato, Plotinus and the neoplatonic tradition (Augustine, Farâbî). At the moment, Michel Fattal is professor (since 1994) of ancient and medieval philosophy at the University Grenoble Alpes, France.

The Charles Lyon Caen Prize was awarded by the Academy of Moral and Political Sciences at the Institut de France (Paris) on November 17, 2014, for his work: Plato and Plotinus. Relation, Logos, Intuition, Paris, L'Harmattan, 2013

Bibliography
For a new language of reason. Convergences between Orient and Occident, Preface of Pierre Aubenque, Paris, Beauchesne, Bibliothèque des Archives de Philosophie, 50, 1988.
Per un nuovo linguaggio della ragione. Convergenze tra Oriente e Occidente, Italian translation, Cinesello Balsamo (Milano), San Paolo, Universo Filosofia, 1999.
Logos. Miedzy Orientem A Zachodem, Polish translation, Warsaw, Wydawnctwo Ifis Pan (Institute of Philosophy and Sociology of the Polish Academy of Sciences), 2001.
Logos and image in Plotinus, Paris-Montreal, L’Harmattan, 1998.
Studies on Plotinus, Paris-Montreal, L’Harmattan, 2000.
The Philosophy of Plato 1, Paris-Budapest-Turin, L’Harmattan, Ouverture Philosophique, 2001.
Logos, Thought and Truth in Greek Philosophy, Paris-Montreal-Budapest-Turin, L’Harmattan, Ouverture Philosophique, 2003.
Logos and language in Plotinus and before Plotinus, Paris, L’Harmattan, Ouverture Philosophique, 2003.
The Philosophy of Plato 2, Paris-Budapest-Turin, L’Harmattan, « Ouverture Philosophique », 2005.
Ricerche sul logos da Omero a Plotino, Italian translation, Milano, Vita e pensiero, Temi metafisici e problemi del pensiero antico. Studi e testi, 99, 2005.
Plotinus in Augustine. Followed by Plotinus against the Gnostics, Paris-Budapest-Turin, L’Harmattan, Ouverture Philosophique, 2006.
Plotinus in front of Plato. Followed by Plotinus in Augustine and Al-Farabi, Paris, L’Harmattan, Ouverture Philosophique, 2007.
Plotino, gli Gnostici e Agostino, Italian translation of Plotinus in Front of Plato, Napoli, Loffredo Editore, Skepsis, 20, 2008.
Aristote et Plotin dans la Philosophie Arabe, L'Harmattan, Paris, Ouverture Philosophique, 2008.
Image, Mythe, Logos et Raison, L'Harmattan, Paris, Ouverture Philosophique, 2009.
Le langage chez Platon. Autour du Sophiste, L'Harmattan, Paris, Ouverture Philosophique, 2009.
Saint Paul face aux philosophes épicuriens et stoïciens, L'Harmattan, Paris, Ouverture Philosophique, 2010.
Paroles et actes chez Héraclite. On the theoretical foundations of moral action, L'Harmattan, Paris, Ouverture Philosophique, 2011.
Platon et Plotin. Relation, Logos, Intuition, L'Harmattan, Paris, Ouverture Philosophique, 2013
Paul de Tarse et le Logos, Commentaire philosophique de 1 Corinthiens, 1, 17-2, 16, Paris, L'Harmattan, Ouverture Philosophique,2014, .
Du Logos de Plotin au Logos de saint Jean. Vers la solution d'un problème métaphysique ?, Paris, Editions du Cerf,"Alpha". 2014..
Existence et Identité, Logos et technê chez Plotin, L'Harmattan, Paris, Ouverture Philosophique, 2015..
Du Bien et de la Crise, Platon, Parménide et Paul de Tarse, L'Harmattan, Ouverture Philosophique, 2016.
Augustin, Penseur de la Raison? (Lettre 120, à Consensius), L'Harmattan, Ouverture Philosophique, 2016.
Du Logos de Plotin au Logos de saint Jean : vers la solution d'un problème métaphysique ? Paris, Les Editions du Cerf, "Alpha", 2014 ; rééd. Paris, Les Editions du Cerf, "Cerf Patrimoines", 2016
Conversion et Spiritualités dans l'Antiquité et au Moyen Âge L'Harmattan, Ouverture Philosophique, 2017
Separation et Relation chez Platon et chez Plotin L'Harmattan, Ouverture Philosophique, 2022

1954 births
Living people
Academic staff of Grenoble Alpes University
French historians of philosophy
20th-century French philosophers
21st-century French philosophers
21st-century French writers
French male non-fiction writers